is a Japanese Joshi puroresu (women's professional wrestling) promotion established on August 11, 2017, by Command Bolshoi.

History 
With the closure of JWP Joshi Puroresu on April 2, 2017, it was announced that Command Bolshoi will be in charge of a new promotion Pure-J. It was also confirmed that Pure-J would retain control of the Daily Sports Women's Tag Team and Princess of Pro-Wrestling Championships. Pure-J held it first event on August 11, 2017.

On October 9, 2017, Pure-J crowned their first Openweight Champion, Hanako Nakamori, where Nakamori defeated Manami Katsu in the finals of a 12-woman tournament to become the inaugural champion. Since then, there have been 7 reigns, with Leon being the current champion in her second reign.

On April 21, 2019, Bolshoi held her retirement show from professional wrestling, where she participated in a gauntlet match that ended in time limit draw.

On May 27, 2020, it was announced that Pure-J joined to Independent Wrestling TV (IWTV), a streaming company which airs independent promotions shows.

Roster

Wrestlers

Referees

Notable alumni 

 Akino
 Alex Lee
 Alexander Otsuka
 Aoi Kizuki
 Ayako Hamada
 Ayako Sato
 Azumi Hyuga
 Chikayo Nagashima
 Emi Sakura
 Giulia
 Hana Kimura
 Hikari Shimizu
 Hikaru Shida
 Hiroyo Matsumoto
 Kagetsu
 Kakeru Sekiguchi
 Kyoko Inoue
 Manami Katsu
 Manami Toyota
 Mari Apache
 Mari Manji
 Mariko Yoshida
 Mayumi Ozaki
 Mika Iwata
 Mio Momono
 Miyuki Takase
 Mikami
 Megumi Yabushita
 Meiko Satomura
 Nagisa Nozaki
 Ricky Fuji
 Riho
 Rina Shingaki
 Rin Kadokura
 Sachie Abe
 Saki
 Saori Anou
 Sareee
 Sawako Shimono
 Suzu Suzuki
 Takako Inoue
 Tam Nakano
 Tae Honma
 Totoro Satsuki
 Tsubasa Kuragaki
 Waka Tsukiyama
 Yako Fujigasaki
 Yuu 
 Yumiko Hotta

Backstage personnel

Championships 

References

External links
Pure-J official site in Japanese
Pure-J new page in English

Japanese women's professional wrestling promotions
2017 establishments in Japan
Entertainment companies established in 2017